Phyllodytes edelmoi is a species of frog in the family Hylidae endemic to Brazil.
Its natural habitats are subtropical or tropical moist lowland forests and rocky areas.
It is threatened by habitat loss.

Sources

Phyllodytes
Endemic fauna of Brazil
Frogs of South America
Amphibians described in 2003
Taxa named by Ulisses Caramaschi
Taxonomy articles created by Polbot